Alejandro Carbonell (9 November 1905 – 8 September 1965) was a Chilean footballer. He competed in the men's tournament at the 1928 Summer Olympics.

References

External links
 

1905 births
1965 deaths
Chilean footballers
Chile international footballers
Olympic footballers of Chile
Footballers at the 1928 Summer Olympics
Place of birth missing
Association football forwards